The 2014 TVB Star Awards Malaysia, presented by TVB Entertainment News, Astro, and MY FM in Malaysia, was an awards ceremony that recognised the best Hong Kong TVB television programmes that had aired on Malaysia's Astro Wah Lai Toi in 2014.

The ceremony took place on 23 November 2014 at the Arena of Stars in Genting Highlands, Pahang, Malaysia and was broadcast live through Malaysia's Astro Wah Lai Toi and Hong Kong's TVB Entertainment News channel. A rerun of the ceremony aired on Hong Kong's J2 on 29 November 2014.

Winners and nominees
Winners are listed first, highlighted in boldface. The top three nominees are also highlighted in boldface. Andy Lau presented the Lifetime Achievement Award to Law Lan and Lau Kong.

Programs

Acting and hosting
Winners are listed first, highlighted in boldface. The top three nominees are also highlighted in boldface.

Other
TVB Lifetime Achievement Award
Law Lan and Lau Kong

Rising TVB Star in Malaysia
Fred Cheng

References

TVB original programming
2014 television awards
2014 in Hong Kong television
Genting Highlands